The Revolt of the Masses is a book by José Ortega y Gasset. It was first published as a series of articles in the newspaper El Sol in 1929, and as a book in 1930; the English translation, first published two years later, was authorized by Ortega. While the published version notes that the translator asked to remain anonymous, more recent editions also record that its US copyright was renewed in 1960 by a Teresa Carey, and the US Copyright Office's published list of US copyright renewals for January 1960 gives the translator as J. R. Carey.

A second translation was published in 1985 by the University of Notre Dame Press in association with W. W. Norton & Co. This translation was completed by Anthony Kerrigan (translator) and Kenneth Moore (editor). An introduction was written by novelist Saul Bellow.

Summary 
In this work, Ortega traces the genesis of the "mass-man" and analyzes his constitution, en route to describing the rise to power and action of the masses in society. Ortega is throughout quite critical of both the masses and the mass-men of which they are made up, contrasting "noble life and common life" and excoriating the barbarism and primitivism he sees in the mass-man. 

He does not, however, refer to specific social classes, as has been so commonly misunderstood in the English-speaking world. Ortega states that the mass-man could be from any social background, but his specific target is the bourgeois educated man, the señorito satisfecho (satisfied young man, or Mr. Satisfied), the specialist who believes he has it all and extends the command he has of his subject to others, contemptuous of his ignorance in all of them. 

Ortega's summary of what he attempted in the book exemplifies this quite well, while simultaneously providing the author's own views on his work: "In this essay an attempt has been made to sketch a certain type of European, mainly by analyzing his behaviour as regards the very civilization into which he was born". This had to be done because that individual "does not represent a new civilisation struggling with a previous one, but a mere negation ..."

Notable quotes

See also
Ortega hypothesis
Technocracy
Mass culture

References
 Pedro Blas Gonzalez. Ortega's 'The Revolt of the Masses' and the Triumph of the New Man,  Algora Publishing, 2007.

External links

 Ortega y Gasset's Revolt of the Masses (excerpt)
 How The Revolt of the Masses Anticipated the Digital Age (Ted Gioia)
 Revolt of the Masses (PDF)
 LA REBELIÓN DE LAS MASAS

1930 non-fiction books
Books in political philosophy
Contemporary philosophical literature
Works by José Ortega y Gasset